José López (15 December 1922 – 24 April 2011) was a Chilean footballer. He played in six matches for the Chile national football team from 1946 to 1950. He was also part of Chile's squad for the 1946 South American Championship.

References

External links
 
 

1922 births
2011 deaths
Chilean footballers
Chile international footballers
Place of birth missing
Association football defenders
Magallanes footballers